The Lung Kong Tin Yee Association, also known as the Four Brothers, is a worldwide ethnic fraternity.

Lung Kong in the United States

California

The California Gold Rush and construction of the transcontinental railroad in the mid-1800s led many men, especially from Guangdong Province, China, to immigrate to California.  Due to social hostilities and discrimination, most immigrants were forced to stay in the San Francisco Chinatown area. Many different family groups started to form family associations.

In 1876, the families of Lew, Quan, Jung, and Chew built a "Lung Kong Ancient Temple" in the heart of San Francisco Chinatown, a replica of the same Temple in Shui Kou County (水口镇), Kaiping built in 1662 as a place of worship and meetings. As years passed, more four-family members arrived in San Francisco. Around 1895, two four-family associations had organized: the San Francisco Lung Kong Association and the San Francisco Mu Tin Association (later changing its name to Ming Yee Association). The former engaged in fraternal activities such as providing a place for meetings, promoting social activities for members, and aiding newly arrived members from Guangdong Province, China. The latter was formed for the protection of its members from unfair hostilities.

The San Francisco earthquake of 1906 completely destroyed the Temple and all historical records. In 1910, the four-family forefathers built a new "Lung Kong Building" at 1034 Stockton Street which became the home of the San Francisco Lung Kong Association. In 1924, another building was acquired at 924 Grant Avenue, named the "Ming Yee Building", in which the San Francisco Lung Kong Association has resided ever since. As economic opportunities began to open across the country, four-family members traveled to different parts of the country to work, settle, and form additional four-family associations with names such as Lung Kong (龍岡), Mu Tin (睦親), Ming Yee (名義), and Four Brothers (四兄弟).

External links

Pan American Lung Kong Tin Yee Association

Tongs (organizations)
Buildings and structures destroyed in the 1906 San Francisco earthquake
Chinatown, San Francisco